Friedrich Wilhelm Heinrich Theodor Hosemann (24 September 1807, Brandenburg an der Havel – 15 October 1875, Berlin) was a German genre painter, draftsman, illustrator and caricaturist.

Life 
Hosemann was the son of an officer in the Prussian Army and moved about frequently until, at the age of twelve, he was apprenticed to the lithography firm of Arnz & Winckelmann in Düsseldorf. Three years later, he was already employed as a draftsman for a salary of 200 Thalers annually. At the same time, he attended the Düsseldorf Art Academy.

In 1828, Winckelmann went into business on his own, later forming a publishing company called Winckelmann and Sons in Berlin. Hosemann went with him as Chief Illustrator for double his previous salary. That year, he provided many drawings for children's books and by 1830 was well known for his humorous drawings. He was soon providing illustrations for several publishers. From 1834 to 1852, he enjoyed a fruitful collaboration with the satirist Adolf Glassbrenner; most notably a series of 32 books entitled Berlin wie es ist und – trinkt (Berlin As It Is and - Drunk).

From 1842 to 1855, he was a member of a literary society called Tunnel über der Spree, where he was known as "Hogarth". In the 1850s, he was also associated with the group Rütli, editing their yearbook and providing engraved illustrations.

In 1857, he was appointed a Professor at the Prussian Academy of Arts and became a full member in 1860. The well-known illustrator and photographer Heinrich Zille was one of his students.

In 1910, a street in the Pankow district of Berlin was named in his honor.

Illustrations
A large collection of his illustrations have been digitalized by the University and State Library Düsseldorf, including the collected works of E. T. A. Hoffmann:
 E. T. A. Hoffmann’s gesammelte Schriften. Mit Federzeichnungen von Theodor Hosemann. Reinmer, Berlin 1857. 
 Bd. 3: Die Serapion-Brüder. 
 Bd. 4: Die Serapion-Brüder. 
 Bd. 5: Nachtstücke. 
 Bd. 6: Die Elixiere des Teufels: Nachgelassene Papiere des Bruders Medardus, eines Capuziners. 
 Bd. 7: Fantasiestücke in Callot’s Manier: Blätter aus dem Tagebuch eines reisenden Enthusiasten. 
 Bd. 8: Lebens-Ansichten des Katers Murr: nebst fragmentarischer Biographie des Kapllmeistern Johannes Kreisler in zufälligen Makulaturblättern. 
 Bd. 11: E.T.A. Hoffmann’s Erzählungen aus seinen letzten Lebensjahren: Theil 1. 
 Bd. 12: E.T.A. Hoffmann’s Erzählungen aus seinen letzten Lebensjahren: Theil 2. 

The complete collection may be found in the corresponding article on German Wikipedia.

References

Further reading 
 Lothar Brieger: Theodor Hosemann. Ein Altmeister Berliner Malerei. with a catalog by Karl Hobrecker. Delphin-Verlag, Munich, 1920. 
 Hans Ludwig: Theodor Hosemann. Eulenspiegel-Verlag, Berlin (DDR) 1973 (other editions: Rogner und Bernhard, Munich 1974; Eulenspiegel-Verlag, Berlin 1980 and 1987; Stapp, Berlin 1981)

External links 

 
 Short biography @ Laokoon-in-Berlin

1807 births
1875 deaths
19th-century German painters
19th-century German male artists
German male painters
German illustrators
Kunstakademie Düsseldorf alumni
German caricaturists
People from Brandenburg an der Havel
Academic staff of the Prussian Academy of Arts